Mary H. Coleman (born July 25, 1946) is an American politician. From 1994 to 2015, she served as member of the Mississippi House of Representatives for the 65th district. She did not seek re-election to the House in 2015 and instead ran for a seat on the Central District Transportation Commission. She won in the Democratic primary but lost in the general election to Republican Dick Hall.

References 

1946 births
Living people
People from Winston County, Mississippi
Democratic Party members of the Mississippi House of Representatives
Women state legislators in Mississippi
21st-century American politicians
21st-century American women politicians